Kozun may refer to:

 Kozun (surname)
 Kozun, Iran, a village in South Khorasan Province, Iran

See also